Sea Cow Lake is a residential area in central Durban, KwaZulu-Natal, South Africa.

References

Suburbs of Durban